The Treboš ambush was an attack carried out by the Albanian National Army (ANA) against a convoy of the Special Police Unit "Lions" near the village of Treboš on 11 November 2001. The Macedonian government accused the NLA of setting up the ambush but the NLA denied responsibility, instead a group known as the ANA claimed responsibility.The ambush occurred after the war of 2001 officially ended with the signing of the Ohrid Framework Agreement when members of the special Macedonian police forces were attacked on the road to Treboš where they were supposed to secure a mass grave suspected of containing the bodies of 13 Macedonian civilians kidnapped by the NLA

References 

Attacks in Europe in 2001
2001 insurgency in Macedonia
Tetovo Municipality
Ambushes in Europe
November 2001 events in Europe